The Ivor Novello Awards are held annually since 1956 by the Ivors Academy, formerly the British Academy of Songwriters, Composers and Authors, to recognize the excellence in songwriting and composing. The following list consists of all the winners and nominees of the awards by year, the winners are listed first and in bold followed by the nominees if present.

The awards and/or nominations are received by the songwriters of the nominated work, not the performers, unless they also have songwriting credits.

1970s
1970

The 15th Ivor Novello Awards were presented on May 10, 1970 at Talk of The Town, London.

1971

The 16th Ivor Novello Awards were in 1971.

1972

The 17th Ivor Novello Awards were broadcast on BBC Radio 2 on June 28, 1972, with the winners being presented by Robin Boyle.

1973

The 18th Ivor Novello Awards took place at the Music Publishers Association Lunch at the Connaught Rooms, London on May 3, 1973.

1974

The 19th Ivor Novello Awards were broadcast on BBC Radio 2 on May 17, 1974. The awards were introduced by Alan Black.

1975

The 20th Ivor Novello Awards took place at the Dorchester Hotel, London and were broadcast on BBC Radio 2 on May 22, 1975. The awards were introduced by Len Jackson.

1976

The 21st Ivor Novello Awards took place on May 11, 1976, at the Dorchester Hotel, London.

1980s
1980

The 25th Ivors were held at the Grosvenor House, London.

1981

The 26th Ivors were held at the Grosvenor House, London.

1982

The 27th Ivors were held at the Grosvenor House, London.

1983

The 28th Ivor Novello Awards were held at the Grosvenor House, London.

1984

The 29th Ivor Novello Awards were held at the Grosvenor House, London.

1985

The 30th Ivor Novello Awards were held at the Grosvenor House, London.

1986

The 31st Ivor Novello Awards were held at the Grosvenor House, London.

1987

The 32nd Ivor Novello Awards were held on April 15, 1987, at the Grosvenor House, London.

1988

The 33rd Ivor Novello Awards held on April 7, 1988, at the Grosvenor House, London.

1989

The 34th Ivor Nvello Awards were presented on April 4, 1989, at the Grosvenor House, London.

References

External links

 Ivor Awards archive